Japanese musician Yoshiki has released 3 solo studio albums as of April 2017 and is credited as a songwriter, producer or arranger for a number of artists. Chart rankings are weekly, unless otherwise stated.

Solo releases

Studio albums

Compilation albums

Singles

Artist compilations and collaborations

Home videos

Group works

X Japan

Violet UK

L.O.X.

V2

Globe

ToshI feat Yoshiki

Credited work

Singles

Albums

Other work 
Remedy (Abandoned Pools, 2002, cameo appearance in music video)
To Be the Best (Tenacious D, March 26, 2012, cameo appearance in music video)

References

External links
 Yoshiki discography at Discogs
 Yoshiki discography on iTunes

Discographies of Japanese artists